The Coates, later Milnes Coates, baronetcy, of Helperby Hall in Helperby in the North Riding of the County of York, is a title in the Baronetage of the United Kingdom. It was created on 29 June 1911 for Edward Coates. He was a member of Coates, Son & Co, stockbrokers, and represented Lewisham in the House of Commons as a conservative. The second baronet married Lady Celia Hermione, daughter of Robert Crewe-Milnes, 1st Marquess of Crewe, in 1906, and assumed by deed poll the additional surname of Milnes in 1946. The fourth baronet is professor of medical microbiology at St George's Hospital Medical School, London.

Coates, later Milnes Coates baronets, of Helperby Hall (1911)
Sir Edward Feetham Coates, 1st Baronet (1853–1921)
Sir Clive Milnes Coates, 2nd Baronet (1879–1971)
Sir Robert Edward James Clive Milnes Coates, 3rd Baronet (1907–1982)
Sir Anthony Robert Milnes Coates, 4th Baronet (born 1948)

See also
Marquess of Crewe
Milnes baronets
Coates baronets
Coats baronets

References

Kidd, Charles, Williamson, David (editors). Debrett's Peerage and Baronetage (1990 edition). New York: St Martin's Press, 1990, 

Milnes Coates